William Mercer may refer to:
William Mercer (poet) (c. 1605–c. 1675), Scottish poet and army officer
William Thomas Mercer (1821–1879), British Colonial Secretary in Hong Kong, 1859–1868
William W. Mercer, American politician from Montana and former United States Attorney
William (Rosko) Mercer (1927–2000), known as Rosko, American news announcer and disc jockey
Bill Mercer (born 1926), American sportscaster
William Mercer (rugby league) (born 1906), rugby league footballer of the 1930s for England and St Helens RLFC
William Mercer (cricketer) (1922–1989), English cricketer
William Mercer (Australian politician) (1796–1871), British Army officer, landowner, pastoralist, and politician in colonial New South Wales
Willie Mercer (1874–1932), Scottish footballer

See also
Billy Mercer (disambiguation)